Oumarou Idani is a Burkinabé politician. He is the Minister of Mines and Quarries since 20 February 2017.

Biography
Oumarou Idani graduated from the Interstates School for Rural Equipment Engineers in 1981. In 1991, he received postgraduate diploma from Financial, Economics and Banking Studies Centre of Paris.

On 20 February 2017, Idani was appointed Minister of Mines and Quarries by the Prime Minister Thieba. He remained the position in Dabiré cabinet.

Health
During the 2020 coronavirus outbreak, on 21 March, Idani contracted the coronavirus.

References

Living people
Government ministers of Burkina Faso
Mining ministers of Burkina Faso
Year of birth missing (living people)
21st-century Burkinabé people